Forchtenstein (until 1972, Forchtenau, Fraknó, Fortnava) is a town in the district of Mattersburg in the Austrian state of Burgenland.  It is the location of Forchtenstein Castle, one of the many palaces of the famous Esterházy family.

It consists of two subdivisions (Katastralgemeinden) which were formerly separate towns: Forchtenau (Hungarian: Fraknó) and Neustift an der Rosalia (Hungarian: Újtelek).

Population

The castle gained a nickname as the "Castle of Fear".  The castle has one red and one black tower.  The castle boasted many torture chambers including one called the Pit of Oblivion, a deep pit where torture victims would be strung upside down and deprived of food and water until they died.  The Pit of Oblivion is located in the black tower. Although many of the rooms are now available to the public either for rental or visitation, the treasure room of the castle still remains private and inaccessible.

Gallery

References

External links 
 Medieval Warfare: Castles of Fear 

Cities and towns in Mattersburg District
Croatian communities in Burgenland
Esterházy family